Turkish American Cultural Alliance (TACA) is a non-profit, non-political Chicago based organization. It was formed in 1968. It creates public awareness for Turkish culture, Turkey and Turkish people in Chicago and Illinois, United States.

TACA is the main organizer of the annual Chicago Turkish Festival in collaboration with the Turkish General Consulate in Chicago attracting more than 100,000 visitors every year in the heart of downtown Chicago.

TACA's mission is to foster and promote the Turkish culture, art, history, and heritage among our communities, and to organize activities to bring together the Turkish-American Communities of Illinois and Northwest Indiana.

See also
 Turkish diaspora

External links
 Turkish American Cultural Alliance

European American culture in Illinois
Middle Eastern-American culture in Illinois
Turkish-American history
Turkey–United States relations
Turkish diaspora organizations
Organizations based in Chicago
Turkish organizations and associations in the United States